1947–48 British Home Championship was the second edition of this annual football tournament to be played in the post-war period. It was conducted during the 1947–48 football season between the four Home Nations of the British Isles and resulted in a victory for England for the second year in a row.

England began the competition as they finished it, with a strong win over Wales in Cardiff, whilst Scotland were defeated 2–0 by Ireland in Belfast. The second round saw Scotland again defeated, this time by Wales at their home stadium in Glasgow. England meanwhile were held 2–2 by Ireland, leaving three teams still able to win at least a share in the trophy. In the final matches, Wales put an end to Ireland's hopes with a 2–0 victory but England managed to beat Scotland to clinch the championship.

Table

Results

References

1948 in British sport
1947–48 in Welsh football
1947 in British sport
1947–48 in English football
1947–48 in Scottish football
1947-48
1947–48 in Northern Ireland association football